Mole's Christmas (also known as The Wind in the Willows: Mole's Christmas)  is a 30-minute animated film shot in 1994. The voices involved are Richard Briers (Rat), Peter Davison (Mole) and Ellie Beaven (Young Girl) with Imelda Staunton (Mother). Directed by Martin Gates, it is based on Kenneth Grahame's 1908 novel Wind in the Willows and is part of a series.

The film is light-hearted and aimed at a younger audience.

Plot 
The plot involves a tired Mole and his friend Rat trudging through the snow one Christmas Eve towards Rat's home, all the while unknowingly pursued by two inept and clumsy weasels. Suddenly, Mole smells his home and wishes that he could be there instead. Once at his home, Mole and Rat decorate it for Christmas and prepare a Christmas feast which they share with a group of poor field mice who are carolers.

References

External links 
 
 Toonhound – Mole's Christmas

British animated short films
Christmas television specials
1994 television specials
Animated films based on children's books
1994 animated films
1994 short films
1994 films
Films based on The Wind in the Willows
Television shows based on The Wind in the Willows
1990s British films
Films about weasels